Paranomus bolusii, the Overberg sceptre or viking sceptre, is a flower-bearing shrub that belongs to the genus Paranomus and forms part of the fynbos. The plant is native to the Western Cape, South Africa.

Description

Fire destroys the plant but the seeds survive. The plant is bisexual and pollinated by insects. The fruit ripens two months after the plant has flowered and the seeds fall to the ground where they are spread by ants.

Distribution and habitat
The plant occurs on the Groenlandberg, Riviersonderendberge, Babilonstoringberge and Kleinrivierberge, Caledon, and the Swartberg.

References

External links

bolusii